Henry Gray Turner (March 20, 1839 – June 9, 1904) was an American politician, teacher, jurist and soldier. The Henry Gray Turner House in Quitman, Georgia is listed on the National Register of Historic Places.

Biography
Turner was born near Henderson, North Carolina. He attended the University of Virginia (UVA) in Charlottesville in 1857 before moving to Brooks County, Georgia, in 1859 to teach school.

During the American Civil War, Turner enlisted as a private in the Confederate States Army and eventually rose to the rank of captain. At the Battle of Gettysburg in July 1863 he was struck in the left shoulder by a rifle ball and taken prisoner. After the war, he studied law, gained admittance to the state bar in 1865 and began practicing law in Quitman, Georgia. In 1874, Turner was elected to the Georgia House of Representatives in the State Assembly and served in that capacity until 1876. He also served as a delegate to the 1876 Democratic National Convention.

After two more terms in 1878 and 1879 in the state house, Turner was elected to the 47th United States Congress as a Democratic Representative. He was re-elected to Congress for seven additional terms until deciding not to run in 1896.

After his political service, Turner returned to his law practice in Quitman. In 1903, he was appointed as an associate justice of the Supreme Court of Georgia. Turner died the next year in Raleigh, North Carolina and was buried in West End Cemetery in Quitman. Turner County, Georgia is named in his honor.

Fiction
Turner is the great-grandfather of a fictional character, Henry Gray Turner II, in a book by author Rob Morton, God, Forgive These Bastards. The book places Turner's great-grandson in the early twenty-first century and reads like his memoir. "In the late 1970s," the book jacket reads, "Henry Turner went from being a local hero and star pitcher of the Georgia Tech Wildcats to an abusive, alcoholic drifter. After spending his later years in homeless encampments and psych wards, Turner turned his demons to his advantage and became a kind, beloved street story-teller, a friend of the down-and-out, and a public transit angel."

References

Sources
 Retrieved on 2009-04-16

1839 births
1904 deaths
Confederate States Army officers
Georgia (U.S. state) lawyers
Democratic Party members of the Georgia House of Representatives
People of Georgia (U.S. state) in the American Civil War
Justices of the Supreme Court of Georgia (U.S. state)
University of Virginia alumni
Burials in Georgia (U.S. state)
People from Quitman, Georgia
Turner County, Georgia
Democratic Party members of the United States House of Representatives from Georgia (U.S. state)
People from Henderson, North Carolina
19th-century American politicians
19th-century American judges